Nucleolar protein 7 is a protein that in humans is encoded by the NOL7 gene.

References

Further reading